Sergei Yuryevich Bondarenko (born 15 April 1955) is a Russian professional football coach and a former player.

Club career
He made his professional debut in the Soviet Second League in 1972 for FC Luch Vladivostok.

Honours
 Soviet Top League bronze: 1980.

References

1955 births
People from Nakhodka
Living people
Soviet footballers
Russian footballers
Association football defenders
Russian Premier League players
Soviet Top League players
Soviet First League players
FC Luch Vladivostok players
FC Zenit Saint Petersburg players
Pakhtakor Tashkent FK players
FC Okean Nakhodka players
Russian football managers
FC Okean Nakhodka managers
FC Dynamo Saint Petersburg players
Sportspeople from Primorsky Krai